Segar may refer to:

 Segar (name)
 Segar LRT station, a Light Rail Transit station in Singapore

See also
 Cigar (disambiguation)
 Seeger